The 2012–13 FA Trophy was the 43rd season of the FA Trophy, the Football Association's cup competition for teams at levels 5–8 of the English football league system. A total of 266 clubs entered the competition. This season's competition was only the third time that the Trophy Holders, in this case York City F.C., were ineligible to defend it due to promotion to the English Football League Two.

The competition was won by Wrexham for the first time, who defeated Grimsby Town 4–1 on penalties, after being held 1–1 in normal time.

Calendar

Preliminary round
Ties will be played on 15 September 2012.

Ties

† – After extra time

Ties

† – After extra time

First round qualifying
Ties will be played on 29 September 2012 

Teams from Premier Division of Southern League, Northern Premier League and Isthmian League entered in this round.

† – After extra time

Second round qualifying
Ties will be played on 27 October 2012

† – After extra time

Third round qualifying
Ties will be played on 10 November 2012. This round is the first in which Conference North and South teams join the competition.

† – After extra time

First round
Ties will be played on 24 November 2012. This round is the first in which Conference Premier teams join those from lower reaches of the National League System.

|valign="top"|

† – After extra time

Second round
Ties will be played on 15 December 2012.

Third round
Ties will be played on 12 January 2013.

Quarter-finals
Ties will be played on 26 January 2013.

Semi-finals

Source:

First leg

Second leg

Wrexham won 4–3 on aggregate.

Grimsby Town won 3–0 on aggregate.

Final

References

2012-13
2012–13 domestic association football cups
2012–13 in English football